Md Saad Uddin (born 1 September 1998) is a Bangladeshi footballer who plays as a right winger and sometimes right wing-back for Bashundhara Kings and Bangladesh national team.

Career

Abahani Limited Dhaka
Md Saad Uddin made his top tier debut with Abahani Limited Dhaka on 7 November 2016.

On his debut, Saad scored his first premier league goal of his career against Feni Soccer Club.

International

Senior team 
On 4 September 2018, Saad made his senior debut against Bhutan during 2018 SAFF Championship.

International statistics

National team

U17

U23

Senior team
Scores and results list Bangladesh's goal tally first.

Club
Abahani Limited Dhaka

Career statistics

Club 

Notes

Honours

International
 SAFF U-16 Championship: 2015
 South Asian Games bronze medal: 2019
 Mujib Borsho FIFA International Football Series: 2020
 Three Nations Cup runner-up: 2021

Club
Abahani Limited Dhaka  
 Bangladesh Premier League: 2016, 2017–18
 Bangladesh Federation Cup: 2016, 2017, 2018

References

1998 births
Living people
Bangladeshi footballers
Bangladesh international footballers
Abahani Limited (Dhaka) players
Bashundhara Kings players
Footballers at the 2018 Asian Games
Association football defenders
Association football midfielders
Asian Games competitors for Bangladesh
South Asian Games bronze medalists for Bangladesh
South Asian Games medalists in football